Sir Edgar Rennie Bowring (17 August 1858 – 23 June 1943) was a Newfoundland businessman and politician. He was born in St. John's, Newfoundland the grandson of Benjamin Bowring and cousin of Charles R. Bowring. Between 1918 and 1922 he was the Dominion of Newfoundland's first High Commissioner to the United Kingdom and would later serve as the dominion's final High Commissioner to London from 1933 to 1934 when self-government was suspended. 

In business, he was chairman of C. T. Bowring and Co. and also of Bowring Brothers.

He was knighted in 1915.  He married Flora Munn, a widow, in 1888 and she died in 1939; they had no children.

He was responsible for the creation of Bowring Park in St. John's, Newfoundland. His stepson and protege, John Shannon Munn, and step-grandchild, Betty Munn, died in the wreck of the SS Florizel in 1918, and in her memory he had a statue of Peter Pan erected in the park.

See also

List of High Commissioners of Newfoundland to the United Kingdom

References

1858 births
1943 deaths
Canadian Knights Bachelor
People from St. John's, Newfoundland and Labrador
Bowring Brothers
Diplomats of former countries